Ups and Downs (1937) is a short film directed by Roy Mack and starring Broadway dancer Hal Le Roy. It was released by Warner Bros. as part of its Broadway Brevities series of two-reel musical shorts, released in 1937 and 1938.

The film was made in New York City, and was Bronx native June Allyson's first film for a major studio.

Synopsis
An elevator operator Harry Smith (Hal Le Roy), who works in a luxury hotel, courts the hotel president's daughter June Dailey (June Allyson). She is engaged to another, but when her fiance leaves on a business trip, Harry asks her to join him for dinner.

During dinner, Harry is introduced to her father, who misinterprets Harry's remarks about elevators as being a tip to invest in the Upsadaisy Elevator Company. June's fiance returns and breaks off the engagement, thinking that his prospective father-in-law has lost everything on a worthless stock. However, the investment turns out to be wildly profitable, Harry and June are engaged, and the film ends with them tap-dancing away in a production number dominated by a giant stock ticker machine.

Cast
 Hal Le Roy as Harry Smith
 June Allyson as June Daily
 Phil Silvers as Charlie
 Fred Hillebrand
 Alexander Campbell
 Reed Brown, Jr.
 Toni Lane as herself (singer)
 The Deauville Boys as themselves (singers)

Home media
Ups and Downs appears as a special feature on the 2005 DVD of the film Stage Door.

References

External links

1937 films
1937 musical comedy films
American musical comedy films
Vitaphone short films
Warner Bros. short films
American black-and-white films
Films directed by Roy Mack
1930s American films